Deltophora beatrix is a moth of the family Gelechiidae. It is found in southern Iran.

The length of the forewings is about 6 mm. The forewings are cream, with black markings. Adults have been recorded on wing in early May.

References

Moths described in 1979
Deltophora
Taxa named by Klaus Sattler